Communications '72 is an album by saxophonist Stan Getz and orchestra arranged and conducted by Michel Legrand which was released on the Verve label in 1972.

Reception

The Allmusic review by Stephen Cook stated "As usual, Getz makes it all shine with his golden tone and beguiling solo lines. A good title, but primarily recommended for Getz fans".

Track listing
All compositions by Michel Legrand.
 "Communications '72" – 3:39
 "Outhouse Blues" – 5:15
 "Now You've Gone" – 4:35
 "Back to Bach" – 3:33
 "Nursery Rhymes for All God's Children" – 4:39
 "Soul Dance" – 4:21
 "Redemption" – 3:18
 "Flight" – 4:20
 "Moods of a Wanderer" – 3:46
 "Bonjour Tristesse" – 7:01

Personnel 
Stan Getz – tenor saxophone
Eddy Louiss – organ
Christiane Legrand – vocals
Unidentified orchestra, strings and choir arranged and conducted by Michel Legrand

References 

1972 albums
Stan Getz albums
Verve Records albums
Albums arranged by Michel Legrand
Albums conducted by Michel Legrand